Johncouchia mangiferae is a fungal plant pathogen. It causes felt fungus on mango.

References

External links 
 Index Fungorum
 USDA ARS Fungal Database

Fungal tree pathogens and diseases
Mango tree diseases
Teliomycotina